Monica Seles was the defending champion and successfully defender her title by defeating Conchita Martínez 6–3, 6–2 in the final.

The tournament was delayed several days due to bad weather. Players were forced to play two matches on a single day in order to complete the tournament. Third round and quarterfinals were played at Saturday, while the semifinals and final were played at Sunday.

Seeds
The first eight seeds received a bye into the second round.

Draw

Finals

Top half

Section 1

Section 2

Bottom half

Section 3

Section 4

References

External links
 Official Results Archive (ITF)
 Official Results Archive (WTA)

Bausch and Lomb Championships - Singles
Doubles